Best of Mucc is a compilation album released by Mucc on June 6, 2007. It contains 16 tracks compiling the "best" songs of the band. It was released simultaneously with the Worst of Mucc compilation. A limited edition version of the album was also released, featuring a bonus six track acoustic disc. The album reached number 24 on the Oricon chart.

Track listing

References 

Mucc albums
2007 greatest hits albums